Paul Deheuvels (born 11 March 1948 in Istanbul) is a French statistician. He is a member of the French Academy of Sciences.

Career 
Paul Deheuvels is the son of René Deheuvels.

Normalien (class of 1967), agrégé de mathématiques (1969), doctor in mathematical sciences (1974), he has been professor of statistics at the Pierre-et-Marie Curie University (now Sorbonne University) since 1974. He was elected a member of the French Academy of Sciences (Mechanical and Computer Sciences section) in November 2000 (he had been a correspondent since March 1994).

From 1978 to 1981, he was Director of the Institute of Statistics at the University of Paris, and from 1981 to 2013 of the Laboratory of Theoretical and Applied Statistics.

Paul Deheuvels is a specialist in mathematical statistics. He is a foreign member of the Real Academia de Ciencias de España, a member of the International Statistical Institute, and a Fellow of the Institute of Mathematical Statistics. His work has focused mainly on non-parametric functional estimation and extreme value theory.

He was an advisor to Total's management from 1974 to 1994. He was an advisor to Sanofi's management from 1978 to 1998. He was a professor at Columbia University (New York) for two semesters in 1989 and 1999. He is the author of more than 160 scientific articles.

Contributions 
Deheuvels made significant contributions to various areas of probability and statistics. His achievements include:
 Characterizing necessary and sufficient conditions for the strong consistency of the Kernel density estimation.

Media 
Since October 2014, P. Deheuvels has been in charge of the Libre-Journal des Sciences et des Techniques on Radio-Courtoisie, a 3-hour programme every four weeks.

Controversies 
Repeatedly from October 2012 (date of publication of a highly publicized article by Gilles-Eric Séralini on GMOs), Paul Deheuvels, the only statistician within the academy, was the only academician to publicly support Séralini's statistical approach, despite being overruled by a communiqué from six academies – science, medicine, technology, pharmacy, agriculture{etc. } - and by the High Council for Biotechnology.

In 2012, G.-E. Seralini received the support of 190 international scientists from 33 countries. G.-E. Seralini's article was republished, in a more complete form, in 2014, in the journal Environmental Science Europe (part of the Springer Group), after new expert opinions that did not call into question either its content or its conclusions. After the disclosure of the "Monsanto Papers", the Seralini case was examined by CRIGEN, which showed that the action taken against G.-E. Seralini had been organized underhand by industrial lobbies, without any objective scientific reference. These elements largely proved Paul Deheuvels right a posteriori.

He also expressed his opposition to the theory of the anthropogenic origin of global warming – in particular by supporting the Club de l'horloge's award of the Lysenko Prize 2010 to Jean Jouzel. Rather, it agrees with the arguments of academician Vincent Courtillot to establish that human activity only has a marginal influence on climate change.

Prizes 
Pierre-Simon-de-Laplace Prize 2007.

Books 

   L'intégrale, Pr. Univ. de France, 1980, 228 p.
   Probability, chance and certainty, PUF, coll. Que sais-je? 2008

References 

1948 births
Members of the French Academy of Sciences
École Normale Supérieure alumni
French statisticians
Living people